Come Back My Children is a compilation album by Fatima Mansions consisting of all eight tracks from Against Nature, along with other early singles and B-sides and covers of "Stigmata" by Ministry and "Lady Godiva's Operation" by The Velvet Underground. Its title is derived from a lyric in "On Suicide Bridge".

Track listing 
All songs written by Cathal Coughlan, except for when noted. 
 "Only Losers Take The Bus" (3:08)
 "The Day I Lost Everything" (4:16)
 "Wilderness On Time" (3:15)
 "You Won't Get Me Home" (3:01)
 "13th Century Boy" (4:00)
 "Bishop of Babel" (2:53)
 "Valley of the Dead Cars" (3:19)
 "Big Madness/Monday Club Carol" (4:38)
 "What" (3:05)
 "Blues for Ceaucescu" (6:17)
 "On Suicide Bridge" (3:27)
 "Hive" (3:01)
 "The Holy Mugger" (2:40)
 "Stigmata" (Ministry) (3:09)
 "Lady Godiva's Operation" (Lou Reed) (4:55)

Personnel 
 Cathal Coughlan – vocals, keyboards, programming
 Andrías Ó Gruama – guitar
 Zac Woolhouse – keyboards
 John Fell – bass guitar
 Nicholas Tiompan Allum – drums, wind

1992 compilation albums
The Fatima Mansions albums